Ba–Shu Chinese (Sichuanese Pinyin: Ba¹su²yu³), or Old Sichuanese (or Old Szechwanese), is an extinct Sinitic language formerly spoken in what is now Sichuan and Chongqing, China. This language is first attested in Fangyan during the Western Han dynasty (206 BCE–8 CE) and represents one of the earliest splits from Old Chinese or Early Middle Chinese. It started to disappear  during the late South Song dynasty period due to the Mongolian conquest which resulted in a massacre throughout the Sichuan Basin. At that time the language was supplanted by Southwestern Mandarin after settlement by people from other parts of China, mostly from present-day Hubei and Hunan.

Phonological aspects of Ba–Shu Chinese are preserved in the Minjiang dialect of Sichuanese Mandarin and there is debate on whether it is a variant of Southwestern Mandarin or a modern-day descendant of Ba–Shu.

Phonology

Song dynasty 
Though the Ba-shu language is extinct, some phonology features of rhymes are able to be found by researching the local literati and poets' use of rhymes in their works.

Liu Xiaonan (2014) assumed that they write verses in Standard Chinese of the Song dynasty, but because their mother tongue was Ba–Shu, they wrote in the Ba–Shu accent of the time, which was reflected in the rhymes.

Coda mergers 
According to Liu's research, there is enough evidence to assume a significant number of codas mergers had taken place or were taking place in the Ba–Shu language during the Song dynasty.

 Ditto, which can be abbreviated as /*am/ > /*an/ < /*aŋ/.

Vocabulary 
Ba-shu language had some unique words probably identified as substrate from Old Shu language by scholars.

Notable speakers 
Notable speakers of the Ba–Shu language include the Three Sū(s) (三蘇, sān sū):
 Sū Shì (蘇軾), who was from Meízhōu (眉州), Chéngdū circuit (成都府路).
 Sū Zhé (蘇轍), Sū Shì's younger brother.
 Sū Xún (蘇洵), Sū Shì and Sū Zhé's father.

See also
Shu Han
Ba
Shu
Bashu culture

References

Varieties of Chinese
Extinct languages of Asia
Languages attested from the 1st millennium BC
Languages extinct in the 2nd millennium